The Bassari Country and its Bassari, Fula and Bedik Cultural Landscapes, located in the southeast of Senegal, is a well-preserved multicultural landscape which emerged from the interaction of human activities and the natural environment. It aggregates three geographical areas: the Bassari–Salémata area, the Bedik–Bandafassi area and the Fula–Dindéfello area, each one with its specific morphological characteristics.

In 2012, the Bassari Country with its Bassari, Fula and Bedik Cultural Landscapes was added to the UNESCO list of World Heritage Sites.

See also 
 Bassari people
 Fula people
 Bedick people

References 

World Heritage Sites in Senegal